Richard de Oliveira Costa (born 1 March 1991), simply known as Richard, is a Brazilian footballer who plays for Ceará as a goalkeeper.

References

External links

1991 births
Living people
Footballers from São Paulo
Brazilian footballers
Association football goalkeepers
Campeonato Brasileiro Série A players
Campeonato Brasileiro Série B players
Campeonato Brasileiro Série D players
São Paulo FC players
União São João Esporte Clube players
América Futebol Clube (SP) players
Paulista Futebol Clube players
Rio Claro Futebol Clube players
Operário Ferroviário Esporte Clube players
Esporte Clube Água Santa players
Paraná Clube players
Ceará Sporting Club players